A High Wind in Jamaica is a 1965 DeLuxe Color film, based on the 1929 novel of the same name by Richard Hughes, and directed by Alexander Mackendrick for the 20th Century-Fox studio. It stars Anthony Quinn and James Coburn as the pirates who capture five children. Other cast members include Deborah Baxter, Nigel Davenport, Isabel Dean, Lila Kedrova, Kenneth J. Warren, and Gert Frobe. One of the child actors is the author Martin Amis.

Plot
A hurricane hits Jamaica in 1870. The Thorntons (Nigel Davenport and Isabel Dean), parents of five children, feel it is time to send them to England for a more civilised upbringing and education.

During the voyage, pirates board the ship and the children end up accidentally leaving on the pirate ship. The pirate captain, Chavez (Anthony Quinn) and first mate Zac (James Coburn) do not wish to risk a kidnapping charge and decide to sail to Tampico and leave the children in the safe keeping of Rosa (Lila Kedrova), a brothel madam with a good heart.

Rosa warns the pirates that the law is after them. Since they are innocent of the crimes attributed to them by the authorities — namely, the murder of the children — Chavez and Zac are unconcerned. But then one of the children, John (Martin Amis), slips from a window of the brothel and falls to his death. Rosa does not want any involvement in a potential murder case and tells Chavez to take the remaining children away. The crew feel that the children are unlucky and demand that they be abandoned on the next island. When Emily (Deborah Baxter) falls ill, Chavez refuses to attack a passing Dutch vessel, wishing to ensure that it remain undamaged and fully crewed in order to take Emily to be treated and the children to safety. His men mutiny, lock up Chavez, seize the Dutch boat, and capture its captain (Gert Fröbe).

A Royal Navy cutter appears and the pirates re-board their own ship in panic. Emily is awakened by the bound Dutch captain, who storms frantically into her room holding a knife and, speaking only Dutch, is imploring her to cut his bindings. Terrified, and dazed by the sleeping draughts she has been given by Chavez to soothe her pain, she mistakes his intentions, and stabs him to death. The shocked Chavez intervenes too late and is left with blood on his hands. He and his former crew are taken prisoner and shipped to Britain for trial. Under questioning in court, the barrister twists Emily's words to imply she blames Chavez for killing the Dutch captain. The pirates are sentenced to hanging for this death, instead of merely being imprisoned for piracy.

In the final scene children play innocently by a lake. Emily stands amongst them—staring at a model ship with adult eyes.

Cast
 Anthony Quinn as Chavez
 James Coburn as Zac
 Deborah Baxter as Emily
 Dennis Price as Mathias
 Lila Kedrova as Rosa
 Nigel Davenport as Frederick Thornton
 Isabel Dean as Alice Thornton
 Kenneth J. Warren as Capt. Marpole
 Ben Carruthers as Alberto (as Benito Carruthers)
 Gert Fröbe as Dutch Captain (as Gert Frobe)
 Brian Phelan as Curtis
 Trader Faulkner as Pirate
 Charles Laurence as Tallyman
 Charles Hyatt as Pirate
 Dan Jackson as Pirate

The title song was produced and written by Larry Adler and sung by Mike LeRoy.

Reception
Reviews were mixed to positive, with some critics expressing disappointment that aspects of the novel were lost in the transition to film. A. H. Weiler of The New York Times wrote, "Although hands involved are either experienced or willing, a good deal of the nuance, philosophy and insight into the human condition for which the book was lauded, appear to be missing on the screen. This is simply a voyage full of sound and fury but one without much conviction or meaning." Richard L. Coe of The Washington Post called it "an absorbing, unusual and fit-for-the-family film, though it will not satisfy those who treasure the Richard Hughes novel ... By shifting the focus onto the pirate-captain, the film all but buries the role the children play." Philip K. Scheuer of the Los Angeles Times wrote, "it is a good movie, an entertaining movie, but it lacks the dirk-sharp bite of the author's prose, and the antic madness that made it such an astonishing delight now cuts through only fitfully." Variety was generally positive, noting a "warm screenplay" and "often spectacular treatment" given to the color photography. A review in The Monthly Film Bulletin stated that although Hughes' novel had "undergone a softening process," it was "surprising how well the film manages to suggest the feeling that the children are living in a world of their own as they play happily throughout their ordeal ... Equally good is the atmosphere of superstitious terror among the native crew, fed by the children's innocent teasing."

Box office
According to Fox records, the film needed to earn $6,300,000 in rentals to break even and made $2,260,000, meaning it made a loss.

References

External links
 
 
 
 

1965 films
1965 drama films
1960s historical adventure films
20th Century Fox films
CinemaScope films
British historical adventure films
British adventure drama films
British coming-of-age films
Pirate films
British swashbuckler films
Films directed by Alexander Mackendrick
Films shot at Pinewood Studios
Films based on British novels
Films set in 1870
Films set in the Caribbean
Films shot in Jamaica
Films with screenplays by Ronald Harwood
Films with screenplays by Stanley Mann
1960s English-language films
1960s British films